Middle Quartz Lake is located in Glacier National Park, in the U. S. state of Montana. Middle Quartz Lake is a  hike from the Bowman Lake Picnic Area.

See also
List of lakes in Flathead County, Montana (M-Z)

References

Lakes of Glacier National Park (U.S.)
Lakes of Flathead County, Montana